Rama VI Bridge is a railway bridge over the Chao Phraya River in Bangkok, in Thailand, connecting the districts Bang Sue and Bang Phlat. It is the first bridge to cross the Chao Phraya River and was initially both a single-track railway and road (two lanes) bridge.  Construction started in December 1922, during the reign of Vajiravudh to link the Northern Line with the Southern Line. Construction cost was 2,714,113.30 baht and It was officially opened on 1 January 1927.

Center of the bridge was torn on 7 February 1945, during World War II, thus it was repaired in 1950-1953 by Dorman Long and Christiani & Nielsen and was officially reopened on 12 December 1953. Following the opening of the adjacent Rama VII Bridge in 1992 due to increase in traffic volumes, cars were diverted from Rama VI bridge. Another railway track was laid in place of the road completed in 1999, making it a railway-only bridge.

The bridge is located 13 km from Bangkok railway station, between Bang Son railway station and Bang Bamru railway station. The bridge has 5 spans, all of the through-truss design: 77, 83, 120, 83 and 77 metres respectively, for a total length of 441 metres. It is thus the longest railway bridge in Thailand, almost 110 metres longer than its nearest rival, the 132 metre River Kwai bridge near Kanchanaburi.

References

Bridges in Bangkok
Bridges completed in 1926
Crossings of the Chao Phraya River
Railway bridges in Thailand
Unregistered ancient monuments in Bangkok